Dave Martin (1907–1975) was an American jazz musician. He was a New York-based bandleader of the 1940s and 1950s.

References

External links
AllMusic biography

American jazz musicians
1907 births
1975 deaths
20th-century American musicians